Gerhard Dörfler (born 29 May 1955) is an Austrian politician, who served as Governor of Carinthia from 27 October 2008 (acting since 11 October), following Governor Jörg Haider's sudden death in a car accident, to 28 March 2013.

Dörfler is a member of the Freedom Party in Carinthia (FPK). Until 2017 he served in the Federal Council, where he represented his home state Carinthia.

References 

1955 births
Living people
Governors of Carinthia (state)
Members of the Federal Council (Austria)